Bells Are Ringing is a 1960 American romantic comedy-musical film directed by Vincente Minnelli and starring Judy Holliday and Dean Martin. Based on the successful 1956 Broadway production of the same name by Betty Comden, Adolph Green and Jule Styne, the film focuses on Ella Peterson, based on the life of Mary Printz, who works in the basement office of a telephone answering service.

Plot
Ella Peterson works as a switchboard operator at the Susanswerphone answering service. She can't help breaking the rules by becoming overly involved in the lives of the subscribers. Some of the more peculiar ones include a dentist who exuberantly composes song lyrics on an air hose, an actor who emulates Marlon Brando and a little boy for whom she pretends to be Santa Claus.

Ella has a secret crush on the voice of subscriber Jeffrey Moss, a playwright for whom she plays a comforting motherly character. She finally meets him in person when she brings him a message under a false name, and romantic sparks and some confusion begin.

A humorous subplot involves the courtly Otto, who  convinces Susanswerphone to take orders for his "mail-order classical record business" known as Titanic Records. However, Otto is actually a bookie whose orders are a coded system for betting on horses. Unwittingly, Ella changes orders for the supposedly incorrect Beethoven's Tenth Symphony, Opus 6, not realizing she is changing bets.

Although the police begin to assume that Susanswerphone might be a front for an escort service, the plot ends happily, with Jeff proposing and Ella's wacky subscribers coming to thank her.

Cast
Character names are not indicated in on-screen cast credits.

 Judy Holliday as Ella Peterson
 Dean Martin as Jeffrey Moss
 Fred Clark as Larry Hastings
 Eddie Foy, Jr. as J. Otto Prantz 
 Jean Stapleton as Sue
 Ruth Storey as Gwynne
 Dort Clark as Inspector Barnes
 Frank Gorshin as Blake Barton
 Ralph Roberts as Francis
 Valerie Allen as Olga
 Bernie West as Dr. Joe Kitchell
 Steven Peck as Gangster
 Gerry Mulligan as Ella's blind date
 Jean Moorhead

Songs 
Music by Jule Styne, lyrics by Betty Comden and Adolph Green
 "It's a Perfect Relationship"
 "Do it Yourself"
 "It's a Simple Little System"
 "Better Than a Dream"
 "I Met a Girl"
 "Just in Time”
 "Drop That Name"
 "The Party’s Over”
 "I'm Going Back"

Production
Judy Holliday and Jean Stapleton reprised their stage roles for the film. Jazz musician Gerry Mulligan, Holliday's real-life ex-lover, plays her disastrous blind date in a cameo role. Bells Are Ringing was Holliday's final film.

Bells Are Ringing was also the final musical produced by the MGM "Freed Unit" headed by producer Arthur Freed, which had been responsible for many of the studio's greatest successes, including Meet Me in St. Louis (1944), Easter Parade (1948), On the Town (1949), An American in Paris (1951), Singin' in the Rain (1952) and Gigi (1958). The film marked the 13th and final collaboration between Freed and director Vincente Minnelli.

Several songs from the Broadway production were dropped or replaced, including "Salzburg", "Hello, Hello There", "On My Own" (replaced by "Do It Yourself"), "Long Before I Knew You" (replaced by "Better Than a Dream"), "Mu Cha Cha" (filmed but shortened) and "Is it a Crime?" (filmed, but cut before release). A new song for Dean Martin, "My Guiding Star", was also filmed but cut. The latter two songs have been released as extras on the Warner Home Video DVD. The soundtrack album was released by Capitol Records.

Reception
In a contemporary review, critic Bosley Crowther of The New York Times was critical of the script but praised Holliday's performance: "[T]he jangled romance they have prepared for her to play is a poor thing, made up of one slight gimmick and a lot of surrounding gags. What Miss Holliday does with the latter is the measure of the quality of the show. ... You can take our word for it: 'Bells Are Ringing' owes more to Miss Holliday than to its authors, its director (Vincent Minnelli), or even to Alexander Graham Bell."

Awards and nominations 
Comden and Green won the Writers Guild of America award for Best American Musical. Together with Styne, they shared a Grammy Award nomination for Best Soundtrack Album or Recording of Original Cast from a Motion Picture or TV. Minnelli earned a Best Director nomination from the Directors Guild of America. André Previn was nominated for an Academy Award for Best Music, Scoring of a Musical Picture. At the 18th Annual Golden Globe Awards, the film was nominated for Best Film - Musical, and Holliday was nominated for Best Actress - Musical.

Box-office
According to MGM records, the film earned $2,825,000 in the U.S. and Canada but only $800,000 elsewhere, losing a total of $1,720,000.

References

External links

 
 
 
 
 

1960 films
1960s musical films
American musical films
Films based on musicals
Films directed by Vincente Minnelli
Films produced by Arthur Freed
Films set in New York City
Metro-Goldwyn-Mayer films
Films about telephony
CinemaScope films
1960s English-language films
1960s American films